Petridis or Petrides is a Greek surname. It is a patronymic surname which literally means "the son of Petros", equivalent to English Peterson. Notable people with the surname include:

Alexis Petridis (born 1971), rock and pop journalist
Dimitri Petrides (1912–1985), Cypriot-born British ballroom dancer 
Nick Petrides, fictional character from the Australian soap opera Neighbours
Philip Bertie Petrides (1881–1956), British colonial judge and administrator
Tosca Petridis (born 1966), Greek-Australian kickboxer and boxer

Greek-language surnames
Surnames
Patronymic surnames
Surnames from given names